Acanthomyrmex mindanao is a species of ant that belongs to the genus Acanthomyrmex. It was described by Moffett in 1986, and is abundant in Malaysia and the Philippines.

References

mindanao
Insects described in 1986
Insects of Malaysia
Insects of the Philippines